Susie is a female name that can be a diminutive form of Susan, Susanne, Suzanne, Susannah, Susanna or Susana.

Susie may refer to:

Songs 
"Susie Q" (song), a 1957 song by Dale Hawkins, covered by Creedence Clearwater Revival (1968)
"Wake Up Little Susie", by Felice and Boudleaux Bryant (1957)
"Susie", a song by Krokus from Painkiller
"Susie", a song by John Lee Hooker from the album Mr. Lucky
"Susie", a 2018 track by Toby Fox from Deltarune Chapter 1 OST from the video game Deltarune

Film and TV 
Private Secretary (TV series), also known as Susie, an American sitcom
Susie (film), a Malayalam film
Susie (TV program), an Australian talk show
"The Susie", an episode of Seinfeld

Fictional characters
Susie, one of the murdered children in the media franchise Five Nights at Freddy's
Susie, a major character in the video game Deltarune
Susie, part of the Legion, a killer in Dead by Daylight
Susie (a.k.a. Susanna Patrya Haltmann), a character in the video game Kirby: Planet Robobot
Susie McCallister, a character in American television series  Summer Camp Island
Susie Carmichael, a recurring character in the animated children's TV series Rugrats and All Grown Up!
Susie Derkins, a secondary character in the Calvin and Hobbes comic strip
Susie Putnam, a recurring character in the Chilling Adventures of Sabrina TV series
Susie Salmon, the main character in the novel The Lovely Bones by Alice Sebold
 Teacher Susie, a character in the television series Sid the Science Kid
 Susie, the main protagonist from the 1952 Disney's Silly Symphonies cartoon, Susie the Little Blue Coupe
Susie Swanson, the infant daughter of Joe Swanson from Family Guy.

Other uses
Smart Upper Stage for Innovative Exploration, an Arianespace proposed European space capsule, to transport humans and cargo to LEO and the moon.

See also

 
 Sussie (disambiguation)
 Susy (disambiguation)
 Sussy (disambiguation)
 Susi (disambiguation)
 Suzi (disambiguation)
 Suzie (disambiguation)
 Suzy (disambiguation)
 Susie's Law
 Su-ji, a Korean given name

Given names derived from plants or flowers